Julien Benneteau and Arnaud Clément were the defending champions. They were both present but did not compete together. 
Benneteau partnered with Michaël Llodra, but retired in the first round against Sébastien Grosjean and Jo-Wilfried Tsonga.
Clément partnered with Nicolas Mahut, but lost in the semifinals to Sébastien Grosjean and Jo-Wilfried Tsonga.

Sébastien Grosjean and Jo-Wilfried Tsonga won in the final 6–4, 6–3, against Łukasz Kubot and Lovro Zovko.

Seeds

Draw

Draw

External links
 Main Draw

Doubles
2007 ATP Tour